The Cougar C24 was a Group C sports car prototype designed, developed, and built by French constructor Cougar, and used in the World Sports-Prototype Championship sports car racing series in 1990. Power came from a  Porsche 6-cylinder turbocharged engine. Its best result was a 7th-place finish at the 1990 24 Hours of Le Mans, being driven by Pascal Fabre,
Michel Trollé, and Lionel Robert.

References

Le Mans Prototypes
24 Hours of Le Mans race cars
Rear-wheel-drive vehicles
Mid-engined cars
Sports prototypes
Cars introduced in 1990
C24
Cars powered by boxer engines
Group C